Solo Piano is a solo album recorded by jazz pianist Toshiko Akiyoshi in Tokyo in late March / early April 1971 and released in the United States on RCA Victor.

Track listing
LP side A
"The Village" (Akiyoshi) – 7:35
"Polka Dots and Moonbeams" (Burke, Van Heusen) – 8:08
"Plaisir d'Amour" (Martini) – 4:03
"Maple Leaf Rag" (Joplin) – 2:25
LP side B
"It Was a Very Good Year" (Drake) – 4:23
"Sweet and Lovely" (Arnheim, Tobias, LeMare) – 6:27
"Old Devil Moon" (Harburg, Lane) – 5:29
"Sophisticated Lady" (Ellington, Parish, Mills) – 7:11

References / External links
RCA Victor RVC RCA-6270

Toshiko Akiyoshi albums
1971 albums
Solo piano jazz albums